Liolaemus pikunche is a species of lizard in the family Iguanidae. It is found in Chile.

References

pikunche
Lizards of South America
Reptiles of Chile
Endemic fauna of Chile
Reptiles described in 2021
Taxa named by Jaime Troncoso-Palacios